Santrač is a Serbian surname. Notable people with the surname include:

Adrian Santrac (born 1958), Australian soccer coach and former soccer player 
Slobodan Santrač (1946–2016), Yugoslav and Serbian football manager and player

Serbian surnames
Slavic-language surnames